A Navy Directory, formerly the Navy List  or Naval Register is an official list of naval officers, their ranks and seniority, the ships which they command or to which they are appointed, etc., that is published by the government or naval authorities of a country.

Background
The Navy List fulfills an important function in international law in that warships are required by article 29 of the United Nations Convention on the Law of the Sea to be commanded by a commissioned officer whose name appears in the appropriate service list. Past copies of the Navy List are also important sources of information for historians and genealogists.  When a ship is removed from the navy list of any country, the ship is said to be "stricken."

The Navy List for the Royal Navy is no longer published in hard-copy.  The Royal Navy (United Kingdom) publishes annual lists of active and reserve officers, and biennial lists of retired officers. In 2015, the Navy List of the Royal Navy was renamed the "Navy Directory."  The equivalent in the United States Navy is the Naval Vessel Register, which is updated online on a continuous basis.

Resources 
Good sources of historical data on the Royal Navy Navy Lists are:

 The Naval Historical Branch, Portsmouth Naval Base.
 The Central Library Portsmouth, Guildhall Square.
 The National Archives, Kew, that has an almost complete set including unpublished editions produced during the Second World War for internal use by the Admiralty.
 The Caird Library of the National Maritime Museum has in its collection bound monthly lists published by the Admiralty, and the concurrently published Steel's Navy Lists

See also
 Army List
 Naval Vessel Register

Citations

General and cited references 
 The 1766 Navy List, edited by E. C. Coleman, published by Ancholme Publishing,

External links 
 US Naval Register (US Navy)
 Useful resources and information, includes latest Navy Directory (Royal Navy)

Directories
Royal Navy
Ship registration
United States Navy